Mats Wilander was the defending champion, but did not participate this year.

Henri Leconte won the title, defeating Jakob Hlasek 7–6, 7–6, 6–4 in the final.

Seeds

Draw

Finals

Top half

Bottom half

References

 Main Draw

1988 Grand Prix (tennis)
Donnay Indoor Championships